William Clarke (born 31 January 1985 in Cambridge, England, Great Britain) is a professional triathlete, World and European U23 triathlon champion 2006, Beijing Olympian and British National Champion 2008 and 2009. He is now racing for Uplace-BMC on the Pro 70.3 circuit.

Results

External links
 Will Clarke's official website
 British Triathlon Federation athlete profile
 British Olympic Association athlete profile
 Will Clarke's Beijing Olympics blog for the BBC
 Corus Triathlon athlete profile

1985 births
English male triathletes
Sportspeople from Cambridge
Triathletes at the 2008 Summer Olympics
Olympic triathletes of Great Britain
Living people
Triathletes at the 2006 Commonwealth Games
Commonwealth Games competitors for England